Sphaerodactylus richardi, also known commonly as Richard's banded sphaero or the Zapata big-scaled sphaero, is a small species of gecko, a lizard in the family Sphaerodactylidae. The species is endemic to Cuba.

Etymology
The specific name, richardi, is in honor of American herpetologist Richard Thomas.

Taxonomy
Sphaerodactylus richardi belongs to the scaber group. Other species in the group are S. oliveri, S. scaber, and S. storeyae.

Description
It has large non-overlapping dorsal scales, except for a zone of mid-dorsal granular scales which is three scales wide. Adults have a dorsal color pattern of 5-6 bold dark crossbands on the body.

Habitat
The preferred habitats of S. richardi are forest, shrubland, and marine intertidal.

Reproduction
Sphaerodactylus richardi is oviparous.

References

Further reading
Hedges SB, Garrido OH (1993). "A New Species of Gecko (Sphaerodactylus) from Central Cuba". Journal of Herpetology 27 (3): 300–306. (Sphaerodatylus richardi, new species). (in English, with an abstract in Spanish).
Rösler H (2000). "Kommentierte Liste der rezent, subrezent und fossil bekannten Geckotaxa (Reptilia: Gekkonomorpha)". Gekkota 2: 28–153. (Sphaerodactylus richardi, p. 114). (in German).

Sphaerodactylus
Endemic fauna of Cuba
Reptiles of Cuba
Reptiles described in 1993
Taxa named by Stephen Blair Hedges